An Australian cricket team toured Ceylon and India in 1935–36, playing 17 first-class matches between October 1935 and February 1936, including four unofficial Tests.

Background
This tour was privately organized, and was not endorsed by the Australian Board of Control. Australia's Test team were touring South Africa, and the Board, determined that the Sheffield Shield season should not be further affected by the absence of leading players, stipulated that no current Sheffield Shield players would be allowed to tour India.

The finance for the tour was provided by The Maharaja of Patiala, and the team was selected and organized by the Australian cricketer Frank Tarrant, who had long playing experience in Australia, England and India. The team's official title was "His Highness the Maharaja of Patiala's Team of Australian Cricketers".

The Australian team
The team chosen consisted largely of former Test players and fringe Sheffield Shield players. The players, with their ages at the start of the tour in late October 1935, were:

Jack Ryder (captain; 46)
Harry Alexander (30)
Arthur Allsopp (27)
Wendell Bill (25)
Frank Bryant (25)
John Ellis (45)
Hunter Hendry (40)
Bert Ironmonger (53)
Tom Leather (25)
Hammy Love (40)
Charlie Macartney (49)
Frederick Mair (34)
Ronald Morrisby (20)
Lisle Nagel (30)
Ron Oxenham (44)

As well, Frank Warne (29) played in three of the first-class matches, Frank Tarrant (54) and Joseph Davis (age unknown) each played in two, and Tarrant's son Louis (31) played in one. The Maharaja of Patiala also played in one match for the Australians, as guest captain against Patiala, who were captained by his son, the Yuvraj of Patiala.

The tour
The tour began in October 1935 in Colombo with one first-class match against Ceylon which the Australians won by an innings and 127 runs.

From November 1935 to February 1936, the team played 16 first-class matches in India, including four matches against an All-India XI:
 1st international at Bombay Gymkhana – Australia won by 9 wickets
 2nd international at Eden Gardens, Calcutta – Australia won by 8 wickets
 3rd international at Bagh-e-Jinnah, Lahore – India won by 68 runs
 4th international at M. A. Chidambaram Stadium, Madras – India won by 33 runs

References

Further reading
 Mihir Bose, A History of Indian Cricket, Andre Deutsch, London, 1990, pp. 99–100
 Mike Coward, Cricket Beyond the Bazaar, Allen & Unwin, North Sydney, 1990, pp. 89–113
 Ramachandra Guha, A Corner of a Foreign Field: An Indian History of a British Sport, Picador, London, 2001, pp. 233–34

External links
 Australia in India: Nov 1935/Feb 1936 at Cricinfo
 Australia in India and Ceylon 1935-36 at CricketArchive
 "The first encounter that ended on even keel" from Cricinfo

1935 in Australian cricket
1935 in Ceylon
1935 in Indian cricket
1936 in Australian cricket
1936 in Indian cricket
1935-36
1935-36
Indian cricket seasons from 1918–19 to 1944–45
International cricket competitions from 1918–19 to 1945
Sri Lankan cricket seasons from 1880–81 to 1971–72